Columbia Baptist Church is a historic church at 25514 Royalton Road in Columbia Center, Ohio. The church was built in 1900 for the local Baptist congregation, which formed in 1832 and had previously used a wood frame building for its church. The congregation built their church from locally quarried sandstone and gave it a design which combined the Stick Style and Queen Anne style. The church features an intersecting gable roof, a gothic arched stained glass window next to the main entrance, and several smaller stained glass windows illustrating Bible scenes. Its  bell tower has a bell-shaped roof and is the tallest structure in Columbia Center.

The church was added to the National Register on July 12, 1976.

References

Baptist churches in Ohio
Churches on the National Register of Historic Places in Ohio
Churches completed in 1900
Churches in Lorain County, Ohio
National Register of Historic Places in Lorain County, Ohio
Queen Anne architecture in Ohio
Stick-Eastlake architecture in the United States